Maurice Turrettini (24 July 1878, in Geneva – 25 October 1932, in Boisy) was a Swiss architect, most notable for his design of Am Römerholz.

Bibliography 
  Summary in Bulletin technique de la Suisse romande, 58(1932)
  Isabelle Rucki [et al.]: Architektenlexikon der Schweiz : 19./20. Jahrhundert. Verlag Birkhäuser, Basel 1998 , pages 462/463

1878 births
1932 deaths
Architects from Geneva